Thomas Orzechowski (born March 1, 1953) is a comic book letterer, primarily known for his work on Uncanny X-Men. Over the course of Orzechowski's career, he has lettered something on the order of 6,000 pages of (long-time X-Men writer) Chris Claremont's scripts.

Career

Early work 
In 1968, when Orzechowski was 15, he met a group of aspiring comic book artists at the Detroit Triple Fan Fair comic convention in Detroit, and joined their comics club. Some older members of the club included future comics professionals Rich Buckler, Jim Starlin, Al Milgrom, and Mike Vosburg. An aspiring comic book artist, Orzechowski quit drawing when he saw their work. None of the club members wanted to letter their own amateur comics, however, so Orzechowski took on those jobs.

Tony Isabella, who knew Orzechowski from the comics club, joined Marvel Comics in 1972, and soon got Orzechowski his first professional work, lettering retouches on the Marvel UK editions of classic Fantastic Four, Thor, Hulk, The Amazing Spider-Man, and Daredevil stories. Within a few months, Orzechowski had worked his way up to lettering for some of Marvel's black-and-white monster magazines. One of his first jobs of that kind was for Monsters Unleashed, on one of the first Marvel stories written by future X-Men scribe Chris Claremont.

Orzechowski's connections from the comics club days paid off again when Rich Buckler pulled him over to letter Black Panther (Jungle Action), and Jim Starlin did the same for Starlin's run on Captain Marvel.

Having moved to California by this time, Orzechowski lettered a number of underground comix titles in the mid-to-late 1970s.

X-Men 

By the time of the debut of the New X-Men in X-Men #94, Orzechowski had developed a reputation as a "new projects guy," and was given the odd issue, and then with issue #122 (June 1979) finally the title. After a number of years on X-Men over Chris Claremont's scripts, the two men paired together on many future X-Men-related projects. (Orzechowski also designed the logos for The New Mutants and Wolverine comics, among others.)

When all was said and done, counting X-Men, many of its annuals, The New Mutants, Wolverine, X-Treme X-Men, and MekaniX, Orzechowksi lettered something on the order of 6,000 pages of Claremont's scripts over a 25-year period.

Post-X-Men 
Orzechowski left the X-Men books shortly after Chris Claremont, in 1993. He joined the team putting out Image Comics' Spawn 1992, where his title was copy editor for most of the first six years. Orzechowski worked for the manga packaging outfit Studio Proteus from 1989 until their demise in 2004. Studio Proteus titles on which Orzechowski worked included Nausicaä, Appleseed, Dominion, and Ghost in the Shell.

In the early 2000s, with many publishers beginning to use "in-house" lettering teams, freelancers like Orzechowski lost a lot of work. Though Orzechowski still does the occasional job for DC Comics and a manga company called Studio Cutie, he did not letter comic books regularly until 2009, when he started doing the lettering for Chris Claremont's X-Men Forever books, and in 2010 for the New Mutants Forever book, also written by Claremont.

Recently, Orzechowski has been working on a comic book anthology called YEET Presents.

Lettering style and influences 
Orzechowski's letters are almost perfectly square, with the exception of the letter "I." Everything has a solid, uniform look to it. Letters stand straight up and down, not at a tilt. They are all painstakingly the same height. Similarly, Orzechowski's standard word balloon outlines are meticulously uniform. He also helped popularize non-standard (non-bubble-shaped) designs for word balloons, to reflect different character voices (square for robots, jagged/dripping for demons, etc.). In the mid-1970s, while Marvel’s production boss and cover letterer Dan Crespi was developing a tight, attractive house style, Orzechowski was 3,000 miles away in California, "buried in design books." Orzechowski figured that "since the X-Men didn’t overlap the rest of the Marvel Universe," there was no reason not to be influenced by calligraphy, record jackets, old movie posters — everything except comics.

Early influences on Orzechowski's distinctive style included the work of Alphonse Mucha, and the comics lettering of Artie Simek and Abe Kanegson. Orzechowski modeled his lettering on the Flash Gordon newspaper strips of the 1930s. Another influence was Robert Crumb's Zap Comix: Orzechowski recognized that Crumb’s title work was clearly derived from the brush techniques of that same era, the 1920s and '30s. Orzechowski studied everything of Crumb's (as well as the late 1960s DCs and Marvels), and developed a lettering style based on all of those influences.

Computer lettering 
In 1992, Orzechowski was among the first letterers to experiment with computer fonts. Working on Studio Proteus's Nausicaä of the Valley of the Wind, Orzechowski found the sound-effect work to be so demanding that computer lettering seemed like a way to save time on the extensive dialogue. His font program, however, was primitive, and he ended up doing that series entirely by hand after all. By 1994, however, Orzechowksi was lettering mainly on the computer, and in 2002 he switched completely to digital lettering, using a Wacom pen on a graphics tablet, in Adobe Illustrator. He explained in a 2003 interview on Comicon.com's The Pulse that "even then [2002] I was losing the knack, as the majority of my work had been digital for a couple of years. The fine motor control slips if the muscles aren’t in continual use."

Personal life 
Orzechowski is not related to comics artist/designer Bob Orzechowski.

Orzechowski lives in Lakewood, Ohio, where he operates a typography and logo design studio. His wife is L. Lois Buhalis, herself a letterer in the comics industry for two decades.

Quotes 

On his favorite lettering projects:

On the toughest parts of hand lettering to master:

On comic book logo design:

References

External links 
 Orzechowski's Facebook Homepage

Interviews 
 The Silver Age Sage

Harvey Award winners
American comics creators
American people of Polish descent
Living people
1953 births
Comic book letterers
Inkpot Award winners